Suozzi is a surname. Notable people with the surname include:

Joseph A. Suozzi (1921–2016), American attorney
Thomas Suozzi (born 1962), American politician, attorney, and accountant